Joseph Charles Madro (March 21, 1913 – September 24, 1994) was an American football coach in the National Football League (NFL) for 25 seasons, primarily with the Los Angeles Chargers. He played offensive guard at Ohio State.

Early life
Joe Madro was born on March 21, 1913 in Cleveland, Ohio. He went to high school at Shaker Heights (OH), and John Adams (OH).

College career
He played offensive guard at Ohio State. He later coached the offensive line.

Coaching career

Cincinnati Bearcats
He was the Cincinnati Bearcats offensive line coach from 1949 to 1954.

Los Angeles Rams
From 1955 to 1957, he was the Los Angeles Rams Offensive Line Coach. He was the defensive line coach in 1958, and the offensive backs coach in 1959.

Los Angeles/San Diego Chargers
In 1960, he went to the Los Angeles Chargers to be with their head coach Sid Gillman. He had been with Gillman since he was in college. He was their offensive line coach for 12 seasons, from 1960 to 1972. He won the 1963 AFL championship with the Chargers.

Houston Oilers
In 1972, he went to the Houston Oilers to become line coach. He was there for 3 seasons.

Oakland Raiders
He did not coach in 1975 or in 1976. In 1977, he became an Assistant Coach for the Oakland Raiders. He was there from 1977 to 1982. He won the Super Bowl in 1980.

Later life
He was Sid Gillman's presenter when he was inducted into the Hall of Fame in 1983. He died on September 24, 1994 in Alameda, California. He was 81 at the time of his death.

References

1913 births
1994 deaths
Ohio State Buckeyes football players
American football offensive guards